Griffith, and its Welsh form  or , is a name of Welsh origin that may be used as a personal name or surname, with or without the s as in Griffiths. The name has many variations as a result of the natural evolution of the name in Welsh, as well as the translation of the name from Welsh into both Latin and English. The anglicized and Welsh forms are treated as different spellings of the same name in Wales. The name can also be associated with the Irish surname Griffin.

Anglo-Norman scribes rendered Griffidd and Gruffydd  as Griffith.

See also
 Griffith (surname)
 Griffiths
 Gruffudd/Gruffydd

Citations

General references 
 

Given names
Surnames